Siân Reeves is an English actress, known for her roles as Sydney Henshall in the BBC drama Cutting It, Sally Spode in the ITV soap opera Emmerdale and Charlie Wood in the ITV soap opera Coronation Street.

Life and career
Reeves was born in West Bromwich, and was raised in Brewood, South Staffordshire. After being educated at Wolgarston High School in nearby Penkridge, she worked in a shoe shop until pursuing acting professionally.

In 1985, Reeves was cast as an original cast member of Les Misérables. Reeves appeared in the BBC soap opera EastEnders in 2006 as Elaine Jarvis for five episodes. In March 2006, Reeves appeared in the BBC singing competition Just the Two of Us. Her singing partner was originally Rick Astley, but after he failed to turn up for the second rehearsal, he was replaced by Russell Watson, and the pair went on to win the series.

In 2007, Reeves suffered a backstage accident whilst rehearsing the play Vernon God Little at London's Young Vic theatre. A stage trapdoor had been left open, and she fell through it, onto a steel ladder, suffering a punctured lung and crushed ribcage, leaving her unable to move for 10 months. In July 2009, it was announced that Reeves would join the cast of the ITV soap opera Emmerdale, playing the role of villain Sally Spode. In 2009, Reeves appeared as Hannah Temple in the BBC drama series Hope Springs and as office manager Gloria in BBC Three sitcom Lunch Monkeys. From 2011 to 2014, Reeves portrayed Bianca in the Sky comedy drama Mount Pleasant. In 2019, she joined the cast of the ITV soap opera Coronation Street as Charlie Wood. In 2022 she won the Special Jury Award in Direction at the first season of Casablanca Film Factory Awards for her short film 'I Know Something Happened'.

References

External links
 

English musical theatre actresses
Living people
Reality show winners
English soap opera actresses
People from West Bromwich
Year of birth missing (living people)